João Gilberto (born João Gilberto do Prado Pereira de Oliveira – ; 10 June 1931 – 6 July 2019) was a Brazilian guitarist, singer and composer who was a pioneer of the musical genre of bossa nova in the late 1950s. Around the world, he was often called "father of bossa nova"; in his native Brazil, he was referred to as "O Mito" ("The Legend").

Early life 
João Gilberto was born in Juazeiro, Bahia, the son of Joviniano Domingos de Oliveira, a wealthy merchant, and Martinha do Prado Pereira de Oliveira. He lived in his native city until 1942, when he began to study in Aracaju, Sergipe, returning to Juazeiro in 1946. At the age of 14, Gilberto got his first guitar from his grandfather despite disapproval from Gilberto's father. Still in Juazeiro, he formed his first band, called "Enamorados do Ritmo". Gilberto moved to Salvador, Bahia, in 1947. During his three years in the city, he dropped out of his studies to dedicate himself exclusively to music and at the age of 18 began his artistic career as a crooner at the Rádio Sociedade da Bahia.

Career 
Gilberto's first recordings were released in Brazil as two-song, 78-rpm singles between 1951 and 1959. In the 1960s Brazilian singles evolved to the "double compact" format, and Gilberto released some EPs in this new format, which carried four songs on a 45-rpm record. In 1956, he returned to Rio and struck up old acquaintances, most significantly with Antônio Carlos Jobim, who was by then working as a composer, producer and arranger with Odeon Records. Jobim was impressed with Gilberto's new style of guitar playing and set about finding a suitable song to pitch the style to Odeon management.

In 1963, Gilberto collaborated with American jazz musician Stan Getz on the album Getz/Gilberto which was released the following year. Jobim played the piano for the album while Gilberto's then-wife Astrud performed the vocals in English while he sang in Portuguese. Although Astrud Gilberto was only in the recording studio to be with her husband, João Gilberto requested her to sing on several of the tracks as he could not sing in English. This resulted with a duet between the two on the track "The Girl from Ipanema" which became a major hit from the album. At the 7th Annual Grammy Awards, Getz/Gilberto won three awards including Album of the Year, which marked the first time a jazz album received the accolade.

Gilberto was known for his demanding acoustic and noise-control standards. During a recording session of the song "Rosa Morena", he insisted on 28 takes to get the pronunciation of the o in "Rosa" just right. Nonetheless, despite his high acoustic standards, he skipped a contractually required sound check prior to a July 2003 performance at the Hollywood Bowl, in Los Angeles. This negligence (and the ensuing sound fiasco) prompted the audience to stream from the venue before the concert ended. In 1997, Gilberto sued record label EMI over their reissue of several of his early works, which he contended had been poorly remastered. According to The New York Times, "A statement by his lawyer at the time declared that the reissues contained sound effects that 'did not pertain to the original recordings, banalizing the work of a great artist." Following the incident, EMI ceased production of the albums in question, and, as of 2008, the lawsuit has yet to reach a decision.

In 2001, Gilberto won the Grammy for the Best World Music Album category in the 43rd Annual Grammy Awards for his work in the album João Voz e Violão. A year later, he was inducted into the International Latin Music Hall of Fame.

In September 2003, Gilberto performed four shows in Japan. His performance at the Tokyo International Forum on 12 September was recorded for a live album titled In Tokyo which was released in 2004. At the 6th Annual Latin Grammy Awards in 2005, In Tokyo received a nomination for Best MPB Album. On 17 May 2017, Gilberto received an honorary doctorate in music from Columbia University but did not attend the commencement ceremony.

Role in bossa nova
With the introduction of the microphone and the amplifier in Brazil, Gilberto realized that the sound source did not need to be emitted intensely, regarding the voice and instrument, which favored subtle and internalized interpretations. On the other hand, at the time of the first "bossa nova" recordings, Brazil still did not have high fidelity recording equipment capable of reproducing more complex sonorities. Due to that, Gilberto and Tom Jobim, Gilberto's first arranger, elaborated complex harmonies under the influence of American music, and at the same time they simplified the general sound, because of the equipment limitation.

In July 1958, Elizete Cardoso released the famous LP, Canção do Amor Demais, containing songs by Tom Jobim and Vinicius de Moraes. The record, however, would enter the history of Brazilian popular music for another reason: Gilberto accompanied Cardoso on guitar on the tracks "Chega de Saudade" and "Outra Vez", these being the first recordings of the so-called "bossa nova beat". In August of that year, Gilberto released a 78 rpm record containing "Chega de Saudade" and "Bim Bom", recorded at Odeon, with collaborations from Jobim, Dorival Caymmi and Aloysio de Oliveira. This album inaugurated the "bossa nova" genre and soon became a commercial success. Gilberto's recording had arrangements by Jobim and the participation of Milton Banana, among other artists. Gilberto innovated by using two microphones to record, one for the voice and one for the guitar. This way, the harmony became more clearly heard. Until then, songs were recorded with only one microphone, emphasizing the voice to the detriment of the guitar. With this innovation, voice and guitar could compete equally, if the voice maintained a natural intensity. Thus, it was necessary to issue the voice in a volume close to that of ordinary speech. With Gilberto, voice and guitar are kept at the same volume intensity, with the microphones picking up both sound sources equally, and, if required, changing the volume of both would be in equal proportion. In 1959, Gilberto released another 78 rpm, containing "Desafinado" by Jobim and Newton Mendonça, and "Hô-bá-lá-lá", written by himself. In March 1959, he released the LP Chega de Saudade, which became a sales success and had a major impact in the history of Brazilian music.

Musical style
Gilberto's style combines traditional elements of samba with more contemporary jazz. His "unique" acoustic guitar style involves a syncopated rhythm of plucked chords, with chord progressions rooted in the jazz tradition. His vocal style has been described as "laid-back and understated". Leonardo Rocha, in his obituary for the BBC, states that Gilberto's music describes "a period of huge optimism in Brazil".

Personal life
Gilberto first married the singer Astrud Weinert, with whom he collaborated on the hit recording of "The Girl from Ipanema"; the couple had a son called João Marcelo. They divorced, and he later married the singer Miúcha (died 2018); they had a daughter, Bebel Gilberto, who is also a singer. They later separated. Gilberto also had a daughter with Claudia Faissol, a journalist.

Gilberto lived alone from around 2009. His final years were marked by money problems as well as declining health. In 2011, he was sued and evicted from an apartment in Leblon by his landlord, Countess Georgina Brandolini d'Adda. It was reported in December 2017 that his daughter Bebel was seeking control of his financial affairs because of his declining mental state and increasing indebtedness.

On 6 July 2019, Gilberto died at his apartment in Rio de Janeiro. His body was buried in Niterói following a private ceremony on 8 July 2019.

Writing in The Guardian after his death, Dom Phillips described Gilberto as ".. one of the country's greatest musicians and composers, a reclusive genius in a nation of extroverts whose work recalled happier, more optimistic times for a deeply divided nation." In The Washington Post pop critic Chris Richards said, "His voice was one of the most intimate sounds of the 20th century – more melodic than a sigh, more rhythmic than chitchat, only just barely. Every syllable that appeared on his lips carried an air of effortlessness, but Gilberto had worked hard to locate that sacred place where a human breath becomes music."

Discography 
Gilberto released several studio and live albums:

 1951: Quando Você Recordar/Amar é Bom
 1951: Anjo Cruel/Sem Ela
 1952: Quando Ela Sai/Meia Luz
 1958: Chega de Saudade/Bim Bom
 1958: Desafinado/Hô-bá-lá-lá
 1959: João Gilberto Cantando as Musicás do Filme Orfeo do Carnaval
 1959: Chega de Saudade
 1960: O Amor, o Sorriso e a Flor
 1961: João Gilberto
 1962: Boss of Bossa Nova
 1962: Bossa Nova at Carnegie Hall
 1963: The Warm World of João Gilberto
 1964: Getz/Gilberto (with Stan Getz)
 1965: Herbie Mann & João Gilberto with Antônio Carlos Jobim
 1966: Getz/Gilberto Vol. 2 (with Stan Getz)
 1970: João Gilberto en México
 1973: João Gilberto
 1976: The Best of Two Worlds (with Stan Getz)
 1976: Amoroso
 1977: Gilberto and Jobim
 1980: João Gilberto Prado Pereira de Oliveira
 1981: Brasil (with Caetano Veloso, Gilberto Gil and Maria Bethânia)
 1985: Interpreta Tom Jobim
 1985: Meditação
 1986: Live in Montreux
 1987: Live in Montreux
 1988: O Mito
 1990: Stan Getz Meets João & Astrud Gilberto
 1991: João
 1994: Eu Sei que Vou Te Amar
 1996: Live at Umbria Jazz
 2000: João Voz e Violão
 2004: In Tokyo
 2007: For Tokyo – edited only in Japan
 2015: Um encontro no Au bon gourmet
 2016: Getz/Gilberto '76 (with Stan Getz)

Awards and nominations

Notes

References

Sources
Castro, Ruy (trans. by Lysa Salsbury). Bossa Nova: The Story of the Brazilian Music That Seduced the World. 2000. 1st English language edition. A Capella Books, an imprint of Chicago Review Press, Inc.  First published in Brasil by Companhia das Letras. 1990.
McGowan, Chris and Pessanha, Ricardo. The Brazilian Sound: Samba, Bossa Nova and the Popular Music of Brazil. 1998. 2nd edition. Temple University Press. 
Gridley, Mark. Jazz Styles: History and Analysis. 9th. NJ: Pearson Prentice Hall, Print.
 De Stefano, Gildo, Il popolo del samba, La vicenda e i protagonisti della storia della musica popolare brasiliana, Preface by Chico Buarque de Hollanda, Introduction by Gianni Minà, RAI-ERI, Rome 2005, 
 De Stefano, Gildo, Saudade Bossa Nova: musiche, contaminazioni e ritmi del Brasile, Preface by Chico Buarque, Introduction by Gianni Minà, Logisma Editore, Firenze 2017,

External links

João Gilberto discography by Laura Pelner McCarthy
João Gilberto discography on Slipcue.com
Plain João—The Man Who Invented Bossa Nova, a biographical profile by Daniella Thompson
Joao Gilberto: The Early Records a special on Gilberto at the blog Worlds of Wanwood
Behind the scenes of the legendary 1962 bossa nova concert
Bossa Nova Guitar Transcriptions – mostly of songs performed by João Gilberto
The Brazilian Sound: Brazilian Music & Culture – site

1931 births
2019 deaths
Música Popular Brasileira singers
20th-century Brazilian male singers
20th-century Brazilian singers
21st-century Brazilian male singers
21st-century Brazilian singers
English-language singers from Brazil
Brazilian jazz singers
Latin jazz singers
Bossa nova singers
20th-century guitarists
21st-century guitarists
Brazilian male guitarists
Brazilian jazz guitarists
Bossa nova guitarists
Fingerstyle guitarists
Acoustic guitarists
Male jazz musicians
Samba musicians
Brazilian composers
Resonance Records artists
Grammy Award winners
People from Juazeiro
Brazilian expatriates in Mexico
Brazilian expatriates in the United States